Zolote (lit. «Golden») is a city in Sievierodonetsk Raion, Luhansk Oblast (region) of Ukraine. Population: . The town consists of villages that were merged to create Zolote. Currently these villages are numbered in a sequence from Zolote 1 to Zolote 5. Before the creation of Zolote they were named Karbonit, Rodina, Stakhanovets, Maryvka and Partyzansky.

During the War in Donbas the Ukrainian authorities lost control over parts of Zolote to the self proclaimed Luhansk People's Republic (LPR). Zolote-5 (formally named Maryvka) became under full control of the LPR. Zolote-4 (Patrizansky) and Zolote-3 (Stakhanovets) became situated in the "gray zone" between the warring parties. On 30 June 2018 the Ukrainian army took full control of Zolote-4, although Ukrainian activists stated that the village takeover was staged, as according to them Ukrainian soldiers had been in the zone since 2014.

On 7 October 2014, to facilitate the governance of Luhansk Oblast, the Verkhovna Rada made some changes in the administrative divisions, so that the localities in the government-controlled areas were grouped into districts. In particular, the towns of Hirske and Zolote and the urban-type settlements of Nyzhnie and Toshkivka were transferred from Pervomaisk Municipality to Popasna Raion.

Zolote came under the de facto control of the Luhansk People's Republic on 23 June 2022. It was claimed that around 2,000 Ukrainian troops were surrounded in the town before its capture during the battle of Donbas.

Demographics 
Native language as of the Ukrainian Census of 2001 (this list contains Luhansk People's Republic controlled areas as well):
Russian  50.34%
Ukrainian  43.93%
Belarusian  0.35%

References 

Cities in Luhansk Oblast
Cities of district significance in Ukraine
Populated places established in the Russian Empire